Salem Methodist Church or Salem Methodist Episcopal Church may refer to:

 Salem Methodist Episcopal Church (Clinton, Indiana), listed on the NRHP in Indiana
 Salem Methodist Episcopal Church and Parsonage (Newport, Kentucky), listed on the NRHP in Kentucky
 Salem Methodist Episcopal Church and Salem Walker Cemetery (Northville, Michigan), listed on the NRHP in Michigan
 Salem Methodist Church (Franklin, North Carolina), listed on the NRHP in North Carolina
 Salem Methodist Church (Huntsboro, North Carolina), listed on the NRHP in North Carolina
 Salem Methodist Church Complex (Cincinnati, Ohio), listed on the NRHP in Ohio
 Salem Methodist Episcopal Church (Salem, Ohio), listed on the NRHP in Ohio

See also
Salem Church (disambiguation)
 Salem Cemetery (disambiguation)